Rangbhoomi: The Arena of Life is a Hindi language novel by Premchand. The novel features an idealist protagonist inspired by Gandhian values.

Set in colonial India, the novel presents a grim account of a blind beggar, Soordas, against the acquisition of his ancestral land. The theme of the oppression of working classes is typical as in other Premchand works. Among Premchand's works, Soordas is the character with the most significant Gandhian influence. He is simple and fearless, and personifies the protest against industrialisation in his village, consistent with the Gandhian views on industrialisation.

References

Further reading 
 

Novels by Premchand
Hindi-language novels